Alive is the fourth studio album by Canadian singer Shawn Desman. The album is a soundtrack to Shawn Desman's short film of the same name.

Track listing
 "Alive"
 "Nobody Does It Like You"
 "Stuck"
 "I Do"
 "Run"
 "Too Young to Care"
 "Dum Da Dum"
 "I Got You"
 "Bulletproof"
 "Won't Give Up on You"

2013 albums
Shawn Desman albums